Gohad Fort (Hindi: गोहद क़िला Gohad Qila) is situated at Gohad city in Bhind district of Madhya Pradesh, India. The town is situated at a distance of 45 km from Gwalior. The fort was built in 1505 by Bamraulia Jat ruler Singhandev II of Gohad State.

Architecture

Gohad Fort has following important buildings inside the fort. Navin Mahal inside the fort was constructed by Maharana Chhatra Singh (1757–1785) of Gohad. Other buildings are Khas Mahal, Shish Mahal, Sat-Bhanwar, Deoghar, Khas Darbar, Am Darbar, Bhandar Grih Rani Bagh and other temples and water ponds.

See also
Ater Fort

References

Further reading
 Ajay Kumar Agnihotri, Gohad ke Jaton ka Itihas [History of Jats of Gohad], Delhi: Nav Sahitya Bhawan, 1985

Forts in Madhya Pradesh
Bhind district